Słownik etymologiczny języka polskiego (Etymological Dictionary of the Polish Language) is an etymological dictionary first published in 1927.  It was compiled by Aleksander Brückner and served through the 20th century as a principal Polish etymological dictionary.

Though now to some extent superseded by more recent efforts, it remains serviceable.

See also
 Dictionary

References
Aleksander Brückner, Słownik etymologiczny języka polskiego, 1st ed., Kraków, Krakowska Spółka Wydawnicza, 1927; reprint, Warsaw, Wiedza Powszechna, 2000.

1927 non-fiction books
Polish dictionaries
Etymological dictionaries